Ydes is a commune in the Cantal department in south-central France.

Main sights
Sights include at 12th century Church of Saint-Georges d'Ydes-Bourg, in Romanesque style.

Population

See also
Communes of the Cantal department

References

External links
Official site

Communes of Cantal
Cantal communes articles needing translation from French Wikipedia
Auvergne